Asymptoceras is a genus of aipoceratids (Nautiloidea) similar to Aipoceras but tightly coiled and with only part of the body chamber divergent from the previous whorl. Shell evolute, expanding fairly rapidly; umbilicus open, perforate; whorl section ovoid to subquadrate.

Asymptoceras is known from Mississippian (Lower Carboniferous) sediments in Europe and North America.

References

 Bernard Kummel, 1964. Nautiloidea - Nautilida; Treatise on Invertebrate Paleontology, Part K. Geological Society of America.
  Asymptoceras in Fossilworks

Prehistoric nautiloid genera